Minuscule 894 (in the Gregory-Aland numbering), A126 and Cι12 (von Soden), is an 11th-century Greek minuscule manuscript of the New Testament on parchment. It has marginalia. The manuscript has survived in a fragmentary condition.

Description 

The codex contains the text of the Gospel of Mark (14:62-15:46), on 5 parchment leaves (size ). The text is written in one column per page, 18 lines per page.

There is also a division according to the smaller Ammonian Sections, whose numbers are given at the margin, with references to the Eusebian Canons (written below Ammonian Section numbers).

Text 
The Greek text of the codex is a representative of the Byzantine. Kurt Aland placed it in Category V.

History 

According to C. R. Gregory it was written in the 11th century. Currently the manuscript is dated by the INTF to the 11th century.

The manuscript was added to the list of New Testament manuscripts by Gregory (894e).

It is not cited in critical editions of the Greek New Testament (UBS4, NA28).

Four leaves of the manuscript is housed at the Biblioteca Marciana (II,144 (1362), fol. 1-4), in Venice. One leaf is housed in Oslo (Schøyen Collection, MS 583/2).

See also 

 List of New Testament minuscules (1–1000)
 Biblical manuscript
 Textual criticism
 Minuscule 893

References

Further reading

External links 
 

Greek New Testament minuscules
11th-century biblical manuscripts